Alexander Raymond Kellner (August 26, 1924 – May 3, 1996) was an American starting pitcher in Major League Baseball who played for the Philadelphia / Kansas City Athletics (1948–1958), Cincinnati Reds (1958)  and St. Louis Cardinals (1959). Kellner batted right-handed and threw left-handed. He was born in Tucson, Arizona. His younger brother, Walt, also was a major league pitcher.

In a 12-season career, Kellner posted a 101–112 record with 816 strikeouts and a 4.17 ERA in  innings pitched. He won 20 games for the Athletics in 1949. 

He had his best season in 1949, with 20 wins, 37 games started, 19 complete games, 245 innings pitched (all career-highs) en route to being a 1949 American League All-Star.

Kellner died in Tucson, Arizona, at the age of 71.

References

Alex Kellner - Baseballbiography.com

External links

1924 births
1996 deaths
American people of German descent
American League All-Stars
Baseball players from Tucson, Arizona
Birmingham Barons players
Cincinnati Redlegs players
Kansas City Athletics players
Major League Baseball pitchers
Muskogee Reds players
Philadelphia Athletics players
Savannah Indians players
St. Louis Cardinals players
Tucson Cowboys players